Višnjevo is a Serbo-Croatian toponym, derived from višnja (cherry). It may refer to:
 Višnjevo, Gacko, Bosnia and Herzegovina
 Višnjevo, Travnik, Bosnia and Herzegovina
 Višnjevo, Gusinje, Montenegro

Serbo-Croatian place names